Associations Incorporation Act may refer to:

 Associations Incorporation Act 1981 (Queensland)
 Associations Incorporation Act 1981 (Victoria)
 Associations Incorporation Act (New South Wales) (1984)
 Associations Incorporation Act (South Australia) (1985)